Philio Houston "Phil" Coe (July 13, 1839 Gonzales, Texas – October 9, 1871 Abilene, Kansas), was a soldier, Old West gambler, and businessman from Texas. He became the business partner of gunfighter Ben Thompson in Abilene, Kansas, with whom opened the Bull's Head Saloon. He was killed by marshal Wild Bill Hickok in a street brawl.

Early life
Phillip Houston Coe was born July 17th., 1839 to Phillp Haddox and Elizabeth (Parker) Coe in Gonzales, Texas, one of the earliest settlements west of the Colorado River and was the fourth of 9 children.

Military career
Philip Coe was enrolled March 24th, 1862 at Belmont (Gonzales Co. Texas) by William L. Foster and 3 days and 53 miles later was mustered in at San Antonio, TX. by E.W. Stevens at age 22. A roster of Company F, 2nd. Regiment Texas Mounted Rifles (Confederate Texas Troops) showed him as Lieutenant with a commission date of September 21, 1862.  Coe was transferred December 11 1862 to William G. Tobin's Company F of Colonel C.L. Pyron's Regiment with a rank of Private.  The sole document bearing Coe's signature was a pay voucher showing he received $100 for one month's service from March 31, 1863 to April 30, 1863:  This document acknowledged payment from W.M. Wilby, Assistant Quartermaster, Confederate States of America and signed "P.H. Coe 1rst Leut co (F). 2 T M R [2nd. Texas Mounted Rifles]."  It is possible Philip Coe fought under Emperor Maximillian of Mexico as a soldier-of-fortune with his friend Ben Thompson after his service in the Confederate Texas Troops, but there are no records to show for sure.

Post-war
After the war, Coe drifted through Texas, becoming friends with gunfighter Bill Longley, and learning to gamble from gunman Ben Thompson, whom he had served with in Mexico. He then settled in Salina, Kansas, where he became a saloon owner and talented gambler. In May 1871, Coe became Ben Thompson's business partner in Abilene, managing the popular Bull's Head Saloon. They decorated it with a large symbol of masculinity which offended the citizens of Abilene. He got to know many of the Old West's leading figures, including John Wesley Hardin and Abilene's town marshal, Wild Bill Hickok. 

Coe took an immediate dislike to Hickok, while Ben Thompson usually got along with him, the men respecting each other's reputation as a gunfighter. Coe and Hickok had words on several occasions. Once, Coe was bragging about his marksmanship, claiming he could "kill a crow on the wing". Hickok allegedly remarked, "Did the crow have a pistol? Was he shooting back? I will be." That only increased their enmity even more.

On October 5, 1871, Hickok stood off a crowd alone following a street brawl. Phil Coe was in the crowd and shot twice at Hickok, missing him both times. Hickok fired back, seriously wounding Coe. However, Hickok also mistakenly shot and killed his deputy, Mike Williams, who was running to his aid. Williams was due to return to Kansas City that night. This fatal accident haunted Hickok for the rest of his life.

Phil Coe lingered for several days, before dying on October 9, 1871. He would be Hickok's last known killing. Coe's body was taken to Brenham, Texas, where he had relatives. He was buried there in Prairie Lea Cemetery.

References

Bibliography 
 
 
 
 

1839 births
1871 deaths
People from Gonzales, Texas
People of Texas in the American Civil War
Saloonkeepers
Confederate States Army personnel
People of the American Old West
People from Abilene, Kansas